The Temple of Elemental Evil is a 2001 fantasy novel by Thomas M. Reid. It is set in the world of Greyhawk and based on the Dungeons & Dragons role-playing game, specifically the adventure T1-4 The Temple of Elemental Evil.

Plot summary
The heroes entering the Temple seek to find a way to save the world from a demon struggling to escape captivity and an evil demigod working to gain control over the demon.

Development
This book is a novelization of the original T1-4 adventure and features characters based on those that Reid and his friends developed while playing the module as part of a Greyhawk campaign in college.

Reception
The novel got both positive and negative reviews. One common criticism was that the pacing felt rushed and that entire sections of the original module were not present in the novelization. For example, the characters in the novel do not spend time in the village of Nulb, and the elemental "nodes" from the module's climax are entirely missing from the novel. Reid has subsequently stated that these issues were caused by the 90,000 word limitation Wizards of the Coast enforced for the book, leading him to cut out significant sections of his initial draft.

Reviewing the novel for Science Fiction Chronicle, Don D'Ammassa wrote that although it is "not earthshaking", the story is "well paced and logically developed, and there's even some reasonably good characterization."

References

2001 novels
Greyhawk novels